Taranis benthicola is a species of sea snail, a marine gastropod mollusk in the family Raphitomidae.

Description
The length of the shell attains 5.5 mm, its diameter 2.7  mm.

Distribution
This marine species is endemic to New Zealand and occurs off eastern North and South Islands, Fiordland and Chatham Rise

References

 Dell, R. K. (1956). The archibenthal Mollusca of New Zealand. Dominion Museum Bulletin. 18: 1-235.
 Powell, A.W.B. 1979 New Zealand Mollusca: Marine, Land and Freshwater Shells, Collins, Auckland
 Spencer, H.G., Marshall, B.A. & Willan, R.C. (2009). Checklist of New Zealand living Mollusca. Pp 196-219. in: Gordon, D.P. (ed.) New Zealand inventory of biodiversity. Volume one. Kingdom Animalia: Radiata, Lophotrochozoa, Deuterostomia. Canterbury University Press, Christchurch.

External links
 Powell, A. W. B. The family Turridae in the Indo-Pacific. Part 1a. The subfamily Turrinae concluded, Indo-Pacific mollusca. vol. 1, 1964
  Spencer H.G., Willan R.C., Marshall B.A. & Murray T.J. (2011). Checklist of the Recent Mollusca Recorded from the New Zealand Exclusive Economic Zone
 
 Gastropods.com: Taranis benthicola

benthicola
Gastropods described in 1956
Gastropods of New Zealand